Yusuf V (died 1463) was the seventeenth Nasrid ruler of Granada in Iberia.

References 
Islamic Spain 1250 to 1500 by Leonard Patrick Harvey; University of Chicago Press, 1992

Sultans of Granada
15th-century monarchs in Europe
1463 deaths
15th century in Al-Andalus
Year of birth unknown
15th-century Arabs